Helen Wilson may refer to:

 Helen Wilson Public School, an elementary school located in Brampton, Ontario, Canada
 Helen Wilson (murder victim), a victim of the spree killer Howard Unruh
 Helen Wilson (writer) (1869–1957), New Zealand teacher, farmer, community leader and writer
 Helen Wilson (mathematician) (born 1973), British mathematician
 Helen Wilson (Australian judge)
 Helen Wilson Nies (1925–1996), chief judge of the United States Court of Appeals for the Federal Circuit from 1990 to 1994
 Helen Ann Wilson (1793–1871), New Zealand nurse and community leader
 Helen Mary Wilson (physician) (1864–1951), physician and social purity campaigner
 Beatrice Six
 Penny Way (born 1962), officially named Helen Wilson, British windsurfer